The Curtiss Model K was an early aircraft piston engine with four inline cylinders.

"Among the most successful early engines marketed in the United States were those designed and built by aviation pioneer and inventor Glenn Curtiss in his factory in Hammondsport, New York. Curtiss introduced the Model K in 1911. This engine was an enlarged and improved version of an earlier Curtiss in-line air- and water-cooled power plant. Each cylinder in the engine had a single push rod and rocker arm, which operated the inlet and exhaust valves."

"The Model K powered the Curtiss Type D pusher airplane, the U.S. Army's second aircraft after the 1909 Wright Military Flyer."

Specifications

Notes

External links

1910s aircraft piston engines
K